Andréanne Larouche  is a Canadian politician, who was elected to the  House of Commons of Canada in the 2019 election. She represents the electoral district of Shefford as a member of the Bloc Québécois.

Electoral record

References

External links

Bloc Québécois MPs
Women members of the House of Commons of Canada
21st-century Canadian politicians
21st-century Canadian women politicians
Living people
Members of the House of Commons of Canada from Quebec
Year of birth missing (living people)
People from Cowansville